Reuben Alcalay ראובן אלקלעי (also called Reuven; 1907 in Jerusalem – 1976 in Jerusalem) was an Israeli lexicographer and author of the most comprehensive English-Hebrew-English dictionary, which expanded the dictionaries of Ben-Yehuda, Avraham Even-Shoshan (Even-Shoshan Dictionary), Judah Even Shemuel (Kaufmann), Meir Medan, Harry Torczyner (Tur-Sinai), and Jacob Knaani.

His Complete English-Hebrew dictionary (1961, 2,150 pages) aimed to contain all the modern Hebrew terms decided upon by the Hebrew Language Academy, and thousands of other new coinages from the Hebrew press literature. The first edition received a three-page review in the magazine of the American Jewish Congress in 1964. The companion volume, Complete Hebrew-English Dictionary, (מילון אנגלי עברי שלם) was published in 1965.

The dictionary contains entries and translations without pronunciation or examples. It is numbered by column rather than page.

References

Israeli lexicographers
1907 births
1976 deaths
20th-century lexicographers
Sephardi Jews in Mandatory Palestine